Planodema congoensis is a species of beetle in the family Cerambycidae. It was described by Stephan von Breuning in 1942.

Subspecies
 Planodema congoensis gahanensis Breuning, 1972
 Planodema congoensis congoensis (Breuning, 1942)

References

Theocridini
Beetles described in 1942